Jeff Danielson (born August 6, 1970) is a former Democratic Iowa State Senator. Having served the 30th Senate District between 2013 and 2019, he had also previously served the 10th Senate District up until redistricting, between 2005 and 2013.

Danielson served on following committees: Appropriations (Vice Chair), Economic Growth, State Government (Chair), Transportation, Veterans Affairs (Vice Chair), and the Administration and Regulation Appropriations Subcommittee (Vice Chair). Permanent statutory committees he serves on include: Public Retirement Systems and State Government Efficiency Review. Danielson additionally serves on the Iowa Capital Investment Board.

His prior public service experience includes experience as the Commissioner of the Iowa Department of Transportation and the Waterloo Planning, Programming, and Zoning Commission. He is a U.S. Navy veteran and serves the community of Cedar Falls as a professional firefighter.

Iowa Senate
Danielson was first elected in 2004 with 16,712 votes (54%), defeating Republican opponent Frank Dowie.  He was re-elected in 2008 with 16,103 votes.  He defeated his opponent, Republican Walt Rogers, by only 22 votes, following administrative recounts in two precincts and a district-wide recount.

Due to redistricting, most of Iowa Senate District 10 became District 30 in the 2012 election and became effective on January 13, 2013.

More recently Danielson has been exploring the legalization of online poker in the state of Iowa.  The most recent legislation signed by Governor Terry Branstad explores the online gaming by instructing Iowa's Racing and Gaming Commission to submit a report on the issue.

As Vice-Chair of the Veterans Affairs committee and a veteran of the United States Navy, Danielson is a consistent advocate for pro-veteran legislation.

Danielson previously served as President Pro Tempore of the Iowa Senate from 2006 to 2012.

In early 2019 he resigned from the Senate, saying "I can't make the Senate service work given that I have to raise my family and pay the bills" after resigning his job as a firefighter. He found a job working as a lobbyist for the American Wind Energy Association, which led to a special election.

References

External links 
Senator Jeff Danielson official Iowa Legislature site
Senator Jeff Danielson official Iowa General Assembly site
State Senator Jeff Danielson official constituency site
Jeff Danielson for Iowa State Senate official campaign site
 

1970 births
Living people
Democratic Party Iowa state senators
University of Northern Iowa alumni
Politicians from Waterloo, Iowa
21st-century American politicians